Jordan Owusu Mintah (born 2 September 1995 in Kumasi, Ghana) is a Ghanaian professional footballer who plays as a forward for Malaysia Super League club Terengganu.

Career
In his native Ghana, Mintah has played for Medeama and Emmanuel Stars.

He later moved to the Philippines to play for Stallion Laguna which was then playing in the United Football League.

Mintah has scored over 17 goals for Kaya–Iloilo in the 2017 Philippines Football League, including three in a 5–2 victory over Ilocos United and a 7th-minute opener in a 2–0 win over Global.

Career statistics

Club

Honours
Kuala Lumpur City
 AFC Cup runner-up: 2022

References

External links
 

1995 births
Living people
Ghanaian expatriate footballers
Expatriate footballers in the Philippines
Association football forwards
Ghanaian footballers
Footballers from Kumasi
Kaya F.C. players
Emmanuel Stars F.C. players
Terengganu FC players
Terengganu F.C. II players
Kuala Lumpur City F.C. players